Myocardial scarring is the accumulation of fibrous tissue resulting after some form of trauma to the cardiac tissue. Fibrosis is the formation of excess tissue in replacement of necrotic or extensively damaged tissue. Fibrosis in the heart is often hard to detect because fibromas, scar tissue or small tumors formed in one cell line, are often formed. Because they are so small, they can be hard to detect by methods such as magnetic resonance imaging. A cell line is a path of fibrosis that follow only a line of cells.

Causes

Myocardial infarction 
A myocardial infarction, also known as a heart attack, often result in the formation of fibrosis. A myocardial infarction is an ischemic event, or a restriction of blood flow to body tissue, such as by atherothrombosis. Without blood flow to the myocardium, it is deprived of oxygen, causing tissue death and irreversible damage. The tissue destroyed by the infarction is replaced with non-functioning fibrosis, restoring some of the structural integrity of the organ but resulting in impaired myocardial function.

Coronary heart disease 
Coronary heart disease, also known as coronary artery disease, is one of the most common causes of myocardial damage, affecting over three million people in the United States. In coronary heart disease, the coronary arteries narrow due to the buildup of atheroma or fatty deposits on the vessel walls. The atheroma causes the blood flow of the arteries to be restricted. By restricting the blood flow, the tissue is still receiving some oxygen, but not enough to sustain the tissue over time. The accumulation of the fibrotic tissue is much slower in coronary heart disease compared to an infarction because the tissue is still receiving some oxygen.

Birth defect repairs 
Another form of myocardial scarring results from surgical repairs. Surgical repairs are often necessary for a person born with a congenital defect of the heart. While surgical laparoscopy still leaves myocardial scarring, the trauma seems to be less damaging then naturally occurring scarring.

Formation 
Immediately after damage to the myocardium occurs, the damaged tissue becomes inflamed. Inflammation is the accumulations of neutrophils, macrophages, and lymphocytes at the site of the trauma. In addition, "inflammatory cells upregulate the release of a myriad of signaling cytokines, growth factors, and hormones including transforming growth factor β, interleukins 1, 2, 6, and 10, tumor necrosis factor α, interferon γ, chemokines of the CC and CXC families, angiotensin II, norepinephrine, endothelin, natriuretic peptides, and platelet-derived growth factors".  Both the necrotic cells and the inflamed myocardium secrete and activate matrix metalloproteinase. Metalloproteinase aids in the destruction and reabsorption of necrotic tissue. After several days, collagen accumulation at the site of injury begins to occur. As part of the extracellular matrix, granulated tissue consisting of fibrin, fibronectin, laminin, and glycosaminoglycan is suspended in a collagen base.  The extracellular matrix acts as scaffolding for the fibrillar collagen to form. The fibrillar collagen is the main constitute of what will become the scar tissue.

References

Heart diseases
Scarring